General elections were held in Fiji in 1923.

Electoral system
The Legislative Council consisted of 12 official members (eleven civil servants and a British subject not holding public office), seven elected Europeans and two appointed Fijians. The Governor served as President of the council.

The Europeans were elected from six constituencies; Eastern, Northern, Southern, Suva, Vanua Levu & Taveuni and Western. Voting was restricted to men aged 21 or over who had been born to European parents (or a European father and was able to read, speak and write English) who were British subjects and had been continuously resident in Fiji for 12 months, owning at least £20 of freehold or leasehold property or having an annual income of at least £120, and were not on the public payroll.

Results

Aftermath
Badri Maharaj was nominated as the member representing Indo-Fijians, but subsequently resigned and the position was left unfilled.

References

1923 elections in Oceania
1923 in Fiji
1923
1923 elections in the British Empire